The Borenore Caves, contained within the Borenore Karst Conservation Reserve, are a series of limestone caves that are located in the Central West region of New South Wales, Australia. The caves are renowned for their karst qualities, namely the numerous fossils from a long-lived reef complex from the Silurian period. Fossils include corals, crinoids, brachiopods, gastropods, pentamerids, colonial tryplasmids and trilobites. Borenore's karst is surrounded by igneous rock that flowed from volcanic eruptions at nearby Mount Canobolas.

Camping in the reserve is not permitted.

Features and location
Access is self-guided and suitable for casual visitors. Entry to the reserve is free.

The reserve contains over forty caves, including:
 Arch Cave
The sink hole is about  higher than the entrance at the bottom of the hill. The Tunnel Cave is closed from May to October each year so that a colony of Eastern bent-winged bats, which hibernate there, are left undisturbed.
 Verandah Cave

Mining
The caves are also notable as a source of Borenore Red marble early in the twentieth century, which was mined in the area until 1994. Borenore Red marble may be found in The Strand Arcade and in Buckingham Palace. Around 1898, while enjoying a picnic at Borenore, Peter Rusconi and his sons Joe and Frank Rusconi, monumental stonemasons from Italy, recognised the rich quality of the marble on the reserve. This marble was considered to be some of the best in the world and was mined for around thirty years. Examples of the famous Borenore red marble can be seen in Central Station, the Sydney GPO, the Commonwealth Trading Bank Building in Martin Place, and Jenolan Caves House as a mantelpiece.

See also

 List of caves in New South Wales
 Protected areas of New South Wales

References

External links
Borenore Karst Conservation Reserve – NSW Department of Environment and Climate Change
Borenore Caves Reserve and Adjacent Areas – Aussie Heritage

Caves of New South Wales
Limestone caves
Nature reserves in New South Wales
Central West (New South Wales)
Protected areas established in 1997
1997 establishments in Australia
City of Orange